The Augusta Lynx were a minor-league professional ice hockey team based in Augusta, Georgia.  The Lynx played their home games at the James Brown Arena. The Lynx, who played in the ECHL, had affiliations with the Tampa Bay Lightning of the NHL and the Norfolk Admirals of the AHL.

The team was named for The Masters golf tournament held annually in Augusta, with the "Lynx" name a play on the golf term "hitting the links".  The Lynx folded midway through the 2008-09 season on December 2, 2008, when it was announced that they were suspending operations and voluntarily relinquishing their league membership. The Lynx failure marked the first time in the ECHL's history a franchise folded mid-season.

History of the Augusta Lynx
The Augusta Lynx were formed in 1991 as the Raleigh IceCaps. The IceCaps moved to Augusta in 1998, a year after the Hartford Whalers moved to North Carolina, becoming the Carolina Hurricanes.

The Lynx were replaced in their market by the Augusta Riverhawks, a team in the Southern Professional Hockey League, which began operations with the 2010–11 season.

Season-by-season record
Note: GP = Games played, W = Wins, L = Losses, T = Ties, OTL = Overtime Losses, SOL = Shootout Losses, PTS = Points, PCT = Winning Percentage, GF = Goals for, GA = Goals against, PIM = Penalty Infraction Minutes

Augusta's final season roster

^ - Currently Called Up

References

External links
 Augusta Lynx Official Website
 ECHL Official Website

Defunct ECHL teams
Sports in Augusta, Georgia
Ice hockey teams in Georgia (U.S. state)
Defunct ice hockey teams in the United States
Ice hockey clubs established in 1998
Ice hockey clubs disestablished in 2008
New Jersey Devils minor league affiliates
Florida Panthers minor league affiliates
Anaheim Ducks minor league affiliates
Atlanta Thrashers minor league affiliates
Tampa Bay Lightning minor league affiliates
1998 establishments in Georgia (U.S. state)
2008 disestablishments in Georgia (U.S. state)